Belle Grove is a historic home and farm located near Delaplane, Fauquier County, Virginia.  The manor house was built about 1812, and is a -story, five bay, brick and stuccoed stone house in the Federal style.  It has a -story, three bay summer kitchen, built about 1850, and connected to the main house by a hyphen.  Also on the property are the contributing meat house (c. 1812); the barn (c. 1830); a chicken house (c. 1900); a cattle shed (c. 1940); a loafing shed (c. 1940); machine shed (c. 1940); a four-foot square, stone foundation (c. 1812); stone spring house ruin (c. 1812); the Edmonds-Settle-Chappelear Cemetery (1826-1940); an eight-by-twelve-foot stone foundation (c. 1900); a tenant house ruin (c. 1900); a stone well at the manor house (c. 1812); and a loading chute (c. 1940).

It was listed on the National Register of Historic Places in 2006.

References

Houses on the National Register of Historic Places in Virginia
Farms on the National Register of Historic Places in Virginia
Federal architecture in Virginia
Houses completed in 1812
Houses in Fauquier County, Virginia
National Register of Historic Places in Fauquier County, Virginia